Vladimirea is a genus of moths in the family Gelechiidae.

Species
Vladimirea amseli Povolný, 1967
Vladimirea brunnealis Povolný, 1969
Vladimirea glebicolorella (Erschoff, 1874)
Vladimirea ivinskisi Piskunov, 1980
Vladimirea kahirica Povolný, 1967
Vladimirea kizilkumica Piskunov, 1990
Vladimirea krasilnikovae Lvovsky & Piskunov, 1989
Vladimirea magna Povolný, 1969
Vladimirea maxima Povolný, 1969
Vladimirea stepicola Povolný, 1976
Vladimirea subtilis Povolný, 1969
Vladimirea wiltshirei Povolný, 1967
Vladimirea zygophylli (Kuznetsov, 1960)
Vladimirea zygophyllivorella (Kuznetsov, 1960)

References

 
Gnorimoschemini